The 2016 Virginia Cavaliers football team represented the University of Virginia in the 2016 NCAA Division I FBS football season. The Cavaliers were led by first-year head coach Bronco Mendenhall and played their home games at Scott Stadium. They were members of the Coastal Division of the Atlantic Coast Conference. They finished the season 2–10, 1–7 in ACC play to finish in a tie for sixth place in the Coastal Division.

Last season
The 2015 Cavaliers finished with a record of 4–8, 3–5 in ACC play for the second straight year, to finish in sixth place in the Coastal Division. On November 29, head coach Mike London resigned, and was replaced six days later by BYU Cougars head coach Bronco Mendenhall.

Coaching changes
On December 4, Bronco Mendenhall was hired as head coach.
On December 8, 2015, former BYU assistant coaches Robert Anae, Garett Tujague, Mark Atuaia, and Jason Beck, accepted coaching responsibilities at Virginia. On December 9, Nick Howell and Kelly Poppinga were announced to be joining the Virginia coaching staff. On December 12, the hirings of Anae, Tujague, Atuaia, Beck, Howell, and Poppinga were confirmed as well as new assistant head coach Ruffin McNeill. It was also announced that Marques Hagans would remain with Virginia's coaching staff as the wide receivers coach.
On December 15, 2015, Shaun Nua was added as the defensive line coach leaving the same post at Navy. On December 18, Nua backed out of being the defensive line coach and decided to remain at Navy.
On December 21, Shane Hunter was hired to be the new defensive line coach.
On March 18, 2016, Mendenhall announced that Hunter and McNeill would switch position duties, with McNeill taking over the defensive line, and Hunter working with the inside linebackers.

Depth chart

Schedule

Schedule Source:

Game summaries

Richmond

at Oregon

at UConn

Central Michigan

at Duke

Pittsburgh (Homecoming)

North Carolina

Louisville

at Wake Forest

Miami (FL)

at Georgia Tech

at Virginia Tech

Roster

References

Virginia
Virginia Cavaliers football seasons
Virginia Cavaliers football